The Hundred-Handers are an international anti-immigration nationalist group from the UK, US, Spain, Italy, Belgium, and Canada. The group are known to put up posters and stickers promoting alt-right nationalism. They have been known to put razor blades behind their stickers in the UK.

History
The group was first reported in May 2018, according to TRT World.

In January 2020, fake Extinction Rebellion posters were reported in  Brighton. These included: 'Stop white genocide', 'House the world, destroy the environment' and 'population control in the third world'. A member of Extinction Rebellion Brighton said the posters were "against everything we stand for". In March 2020, further such stickers appeared in Bedford. In September 2020, stickers with racist slogans and linked to the Hundred Handers appeared in the Crookes area of Sheffield. Stickers were also reported in Scotland.

In June 2020, it was reported that the group had put up messages in Canada, such as: "Never apologise for being white," and "There is a war on whites" and "It's okay to be white."

In 2021, Hampshire Police increased patrols and examined CCTV footage in response to the Hundred-Handers posting anti-immigrant, pro-white stickers in the town of Romsey, including some that read "White Privilege Excellence."

References

Alt-right organizations
Anti-immigration politics in Europe
Pan-European nationalism
Far-right politics
Social movements in Europe
White nationalist groups
Far-right politics in Europe
Anti-immigration politics in North America